Pavezin is a commune in the Loire department in the Auvergne-Rhône-Alpes region.

Geography 
The village is at the top of the Couzon Valley, on the northern slope of the Pilat massif, just before the pass of the same name (652 meters above sea level).

The town is located 40 km from Saint-Etienne.

Population

See also
Communes of the Loire department

References

Communes of Loire (department)